The Elsasser number, Λ, is a dimensionless number in magnetohydrodynamics that represents the ratio of magnetic forces to the Coriolis force.

where σ is the conductivity of the fluid, B is the magnetic field, ρ is the density of the fluid, and Ω is the rate of rotation of the body.

Notes

References 
 

Dimensionless numbers of fluid mechanics